Hornbuckle is a surname. Notable people with the surname include:

Alexis Hornbuckle (born 1985), American professional basketball player
Dan Hornbuckle (born 1980),  American mixed martial artist
Sean Hornbuckle (born 1985), American politician from West Virginia
Terry Hornbuckle (born 1962), American pastor convicted of rape

See also
 Hornbuckle, a character rumored to exist in Mortal Kombat II as a result of a joke hidden in certain versions of the game

Surnames
English-language surnames